The Khyber Pakhtunkhwa Department of Industries is concerned with industry in the Pakistani province of Khyber Pakhtunkhwa. It is headed by the Khyber Pakhtunkhwa Minister of Industries, who is a member of the Chief Minister's Cabinet. Mr. Shaukat Ali Yousafzai was appointed as Minister of Industries by Chief Minister of KP Pervez Khattak on April 1, 2014.

History 
The department was created on August 14, 1973. This department's main purpose is to create jobs, promote Industrial growth, encourage sustainable development and improve standards of living for all citizens of Khyber Pakhtunkhwa. The department is currently headed by Secretary Sajjid Khan.

Organization 
The Department is under the control and supervision of a Khyber Pakhtunkhwa Minister of Industries, a political appointee of the Chief Minister of Khyber Pakhtunkhwa. The Industries Minister is assisted in managing the Department by a Secretary of Industries, also appointed by the Chief Minister, who assumes the duties of the Minister in his absence.

Structure 
 Minister of Industries
 Secretary of Industries

Duties 
The duties of the Department are to carry out approved programs and make the public aware of the objectives of the department.

List of Ministers

References 

Departments of Government of Khyber Pakhtunkhwa
Ministries established in 1973
1973 establishments in Pakistan
Khyber Pakhtunkhwa